List of top goal scorers in the top flight of Norwegian football, currently known as Eliteserien. The statistics begin with the 1948–49 season. The League of Norway, played from 1937–38 to 1947–48, was divided in eleven conferences with different numbers of game weeks and is therefore not included in this statistics.

Top scorers

By season
The following is a list of top scorers in the top football league of Norway by season.

By player

By club

By nationality

All-time topscorers with over 50 goals

The following is an all-time top-scorer list. Players who have scored 50 or more goals are included.

References

top scorers
Norway
Norway
Association football player non-biographical articles